The Rondo Hatton Classic Horror Award, often called the Rondo Award, is an annual award founded in 2002 that honors journalism, scholarship and film preservation in the horror genre, particularly of classic horror film and their modern-day counterparts.

Named in honor of actor Rondo Hatton, it originated at the Classic Horror Film Board and subsequently moved to a dedicated website. Nominees are chosen by a committee that takes suggestions on the website, with the awards selected via an open vote by generally thousands of participants. The Rondo Award was created by journalist David Colton and artist/illustrator Kerry Gammill, and since its inception has been coordinated by Colton, who serves as their presenter annually at the fantasy/horror convention WonderFest.

History
The Rondo Awards began in 2002, after members of the online Classic Horror Film Board, moderated by journalist David Colton, became aware of a growing body of under-recognized journalism covering the horror genre. The awards took their name from the character actor Rondo Hatton, a cult-classic figure in low-budget horror films. 

Comic book artist and illustrator Kerry Gammill designed the sculpt for the award, a bust of Hatton's character from the movie House of Horrors (1946).

The initial year attracted 168 voters. The following year brought 600, and the third year 2,000. As of 2018, the number of voters is generally between 3,000 and 3,700. Co-founder Colton presents the awards annually at the fantasy/horror convention WonderFest.

As Colton describes, "We don't have Best Actor, we don't have Best Actress, we don't even have Best Director. It's more about the magazines and the books and the independent films and the documentaries.... It's a little highbrow in that way."

Significance
Entertainment Weekly likened The Rondo Award to a "horror Oscar". The Award is a "coveted" prize in the horror community. One PBS station wrote,

Horror magazines and websites, including Dread Central, regularly report on the nominations and awards lists.

The awards have been mentioned in such outlets as The Hollywood Reporter, The Austin Chronicle, Famous Monsters of Filmland, Movieweb, MeTV, the UK's Horror Channel, and the Tampa Bay Times, as well as scholarly journals including Psychology and Education, textbooks including Recovering 1940s Horror Cinema: Traces of a Lost Decade.

Monster Kid Hall of Fame annual awards
In their second year, the Rondo Classic Horror Film Awards created the Monster Kid Hall of Fame, with four to nine, but generally six, living or dead inductees. Also created was another honorary award, Monster Kid of the Year, given to individuals with some important achievement in the field that year.

2003
 Forrest J Ackerman and James Warren for Famous Monsters of Filmland magazine
 Movie props and makeup preservationists Bob and Kathy Burns
 TV horror hosts Zacherley (John Zacherle) and Vampira (Maila Nurmi)

Monster Kid of the Year: Arnold Kunert, who successfully campaigned for special effects artist Ray Harryhausen to have a star on the Hollywood Walk of Fame

2004
 Special effects artist Ray Harryhausen
 Author Ray Bradbury
 Special effects makeup artist Rick Baker
 Historian William K. Everson (posthumously)
 Brother filmmakers Richard Gordon and (posthumously) Alex Gordon

Monster Kid of the Year: The Lost Skeleton of Cadavra writer, director, and star Larry Blamire

2005
 Artists Basil Gogos and James Bama
 Filmmaker Roger Corman
 Musician Bobby "Boris" Pickett
 Midnight Marquee publishers and independent film producers Gary and Sue Svehla 
 Little Shoppe of Horrors magazine publisher Richard Klemensen

Monster Kid of the Year: Monster Kid Home Movies producer Joe Busam

2006
 Married special effects artists Paul and Jackie Blaisdell (posthumously)
 Writer and filmmaker Donald F. Glut
 Artist Jack Davis
 Filmmaker Joe Dante
 Actor German Robles
 Painter Frank Frazetta

Monster Kid of the Year: Toy collector Ray Castile

2007
 Museum curators Cortlandt Hull and Dennis Vincent 
 Artist Bernie Wrightson
 Artist Ed "Big Daddy" Roth
 Writer-editor Archie Goodwin (posthumously)
 TV horror host Ghoulardi
 Actor Ben Chapman

Monster Kid of the Year: Sony Pictures executive Michael Schlesinger

2008
 Actor Paul Naschy
 Married Monsters from the Vault publishers Jim and Marian Clatterbaugh 
 Painter Ken Kelly
 Castle of Frankenstein publisher Calvin Beck (posthumously)
 Musician Lux Interior (posthumously)
 TV horror host Bob Wilkins

Monster Kid of the Year: Producer and Forrest J Ackerman friend, adviser, and caregiver Joe Moe

2009
 Aurora model-kit sculptors Bill Lemon and Ray Meyer (posthumously)
 Scary Monsters Magazine publisher Dennis Druktenis
 Historian, critic, and author Bill Warren
 TV horror host Sammy Terry
 Cinefantastique publisher Frederick S. Clarke (posthumously)

Monster Kid of the Year: Monsterpalooza convention organizer Eliot Brodsky

2010
 Video Watchdog publisher Tim Lucas and his wife and business partner, Donna Lucas
 Historian Tom Weaver
 Fantasy artist William Stout
 Poster collector and historian Ron Borst
 Filmmaker George A. Romero
 Mask maker Verne Langdon (posthumously)

Monster Kids of the Year: Historian and writer Gary Gerani; screenwriter, author, and The Twilight Zone archivist Marc Scott Zicree

2011
 Filmfax editor Michael Stein
 Photon fanzine editor Mark Frank
 Actor George Stover
 Horror scholar David J. Skal
 Actress Julie Adams 
 Horror host Morgus the Magnificent

Monster Kid of the Year: Vincentennial fan festival organizer Tom Stockman

2012
 G-Fan editor & publisher J.D. Lees
 Horror host Count Gore de Vol
 Film researcher and documentary maker Ted Newsom
 Artist Stephen R. Bissette
 Scarlet Street/Mondo Cult publisher/editor Jessie Lilley
 Writer Gary Dorst (posthumously)

Monster Kid of the Year: Simon Rowson, for discovering lost footage cut from original release of Hammer Studios' Dracula (1958)

2013
 Monster-mask maker Don Post Studios
 Historian Gregory William Mank
 Horror bookstore owners Del and Sue Howison
 Castle of Frankenstein writer & editor Bhob Stewart (posthumously)
 Artist & publisher Larry Ivie (posthumously)
 Something Weird Video founder Mike Vraney (posthumously)

Monster Kid of the Year: Paul Larson, for discovering lost Vincent Price PBS footage

2014
 Psychotronic editor-publisher Michael Weldon
 Bela Lugosi historian Gary Don Rhodes
 Sara Karloff, daughter of actor Boris Karloff
 Actor José Mojica Marins, a.k.a. the movie character and TV horror host Coffin Joe

Monster Kid of the Year: Frank J. Dello Stritto, author of memoir I Saw What I Saw When I Saw It

2015
 Edgar Allan Poe scholar, preservationist and portrayer Mark Redfield
 Historian and author Steve Vertlieb
 Journalist, historian, and TV/radio/DVD commentator David Del Valle
 Horror host Bill "Chilly Billy" Cardille

Monster Kid of the Year: Victoria Price, daughter of actor Vincent Price, "for her tireless work preserving her late father's legacy in film."

2016
 Film preservationist Bob Furmanek 
 Writer and horror host John Stanley
 Writer, critic, and DVD commentator Richard Harland Smith
 Podcaster Vince Rotolo
 Historian Mark Miller (posthumously)
Monster Kids of the Year: Married couple Don and Vicki Smeraldi, new publishers of Scary Monsters Magazine

2017
 Horror host Cassandra Peterson (Elvira, Mistress of the Dark)
 Producer, director and special makeup effects supervisor Greg Nicotero
 Film memorabilia collector Robert Taylor
 Film creature sculptor Mike Hill
 Actor Haruo Nakajima (posthumously)
 Voice actor June Foray (posthumously)

Monster Kid of the Year: Cohen Media Group executive Tim Lanza

2018
 Memorabilia collector Wes Shank  (posthumously)
 Author Lucy Chase Williams
 Horror hosts Charles "Big Chuck" Schodowski and "Lil' John" Rinaldi
 Filmmaker and underwater cinematographer/stuntman Ricou Browning
 Convention organizer Ron Adams
 Actresses Martine Beswicke, Veronica Carlson and Caroline Munro

Monster Kid of the Year: Film critic and actor John Irving Bloom a.k.a. Joe Bob Briggs

2019
 Author Robert Bloch
 Historian Jonathan Rigby
 Author, editor, podcaster and film commentator Kat Ellinger
 Filmmaker/Blu-ray producer/film historian Constantine Nasr
 Sinister Cinema founder Greg Luce
 Writer George Chastain
 Horror hosts Ron Sweed (The Ghoul) (posthumously) and Keven Scarpino (Son of Ghoul)
 Gadfly David "The Rock" Nelson

Monster Kid of the Year: Filmmaker Jordan Peele

2020
 Blogger Stacie Ponder
 Podcaster Derek M. Koch
 Publisher and critic Joe Kane a.k.a. the Phantom of the Movies (posthumously)
 Author Michael Robert 'Bobb' Cotter (posthumously)
 Horror host Rich Koz a.k.a. Svengoolie

Monster Kid of the Year: UCLA film archivist Scott MacQueen

2021
 Comedian Gilbert Gottfried (posthumously)
 French film historian Jean-Claude Michel, the first foreign correspondent for Famous Monsters of Filmland 
 Attorney and California Celebrities Rights Act instigator Bela G. Lugosi, son of the late horror star Bela Lugosi
 Artist and director Frank Dietz
 Film journalist and preservationist Laura Wagner
 Horror host Erik Lobo a.k.a. Mr. Lobo
 Cultural critic Maitland McDonagh

Monster Kid of the Year: Monster Channel horror host Evan Davis a.k.a. Halloween Jack

References

External links
The Rondo Hatton Classic Horror Awards official website
The Classic Horror Film Board

Awards established in 2002
American fiction awards
Horror fiction awards
American film awards